Marmots are large ground squirrels in the genus Marmota, with 15 species living in Asia, Europe, and North America. These herbivores are active during the summer, when they can often be found in groups, but are not seen during the winter, when they hibernate underground. They are the heaviest members of the squirrel family.

Description
Marmots are large rodents with characteristically short but robust legs, enlarged claws which are well adapted to digging, stout bodies, and large heads and incisors to quickly process a variety of vegetation. While most species are various forms of earthen-hued brown, marmots vary in fur coloration based roughly on their surroundings. Species in more open habitat are more likely to have a paler color, while those sometimes found in well-forested regions tend to be darker. Marmots are the heaviest members of the squirrel family. The largest and smallest species are not clearly known. In North America, on the basis of mean linear dimensions and body masses through the year, the smallest species appears to be the Alaska marmot and the largest is the Olympic marmot. Some species, such as the Himalayan marmot and Tarbagan marmot in Asia, appear to attain roughly similar body masses to the Olympic marmot, but are not known to reach as high a total length as the Olympic species. In the traditional definition of hibernation, the largest marmots are considered the largest "true hibernators" (since larger "hibernators" such as bears do not have the same physiological characteristics as obligate hibernating animals such as assorted rodents, bats and insectivores).

Biology
Some species live in mountainous areas, such as the Alps, northern Apennines, Carpathians, Tatras, and Pyrenees in Europe; northwestern Asia; the Rocky Mountains, Black Hills, the Cascade and Pacific Ranges, and the Sierra Nevada in North America; and the Deosai Plateau in Pakistan and Ladakh in India. Other species prefer rough grassland and can be found widely across North America and the Eurasian Steppe. The slightly smaller and more social prairie dog is not classified in the genus Marmota, but in the related genus Cynomys.

Marmots typically live in burrows (often within rockpiles, particularly in the case of the yellow-bellied marmot), and hibernate there through the winter.  Most marmots are highly social and use loud whistles to communicate with one another, especially when alarmed.

Marmots mainly eat greens and many types of grasses, berries, lichens, mosses, roots, and flowers.

Subgenera and species 
The following is a list of all Marmota species recognized by Thorington and Hoffman plus the recently defined M. kastschenkoi.  They divide marmots into two subgenera.
Genus Marmota – marmots
Subgenus Marmota
Marmota baibacina - Gray marmot or Altai marmot, found in Siberia
Marmota bobak - Bobak marmot, found from eastern Europe to central Asia
Marmota broweri - Alaska marmot, Brower's marmot, or Brooks Range marmot, found in Alaska
Marmota camtschatica - Black-capped marmot, found in eastern Siberia
Marmota caudata - Long-tailed marmot, golden marmot, or red marmot, found in central Asia
Marmota himalayana - Himalayan marmot or Tibetan snow pig, found in the Himalayas
Marmota kastschenkoi - Forest-steppe marmot, found in south Russia
Marmota marmota - Alpine marmot, found only in Europe in the Alps, Carpathian Mountains, Tatra Mountains, northern Apennine Mountains, and reintroduced in the Pyrenees
Marmota menzbieri - Menzbier's marmot, found in central Asia
Marmota monax - Groundhog, woodchuck, or whistlepig, found in much of Canada and east of the Mississippi in northern USA
Marmota sibirica - Tarbagan marmot, Mongolian marmot, or tarvaga, found in Siberia
Subgenus Petromarmota
Marmota caligata - Hoary marmot, found in northwestern North America (Alaska, Yukon, British Columbia, Alberta, Washington, Montana)
Marmota flaviventris - Yellow-bellied marmot, found in southwestern Canada and western United States
Marmota olympus - Olympic marmot, endemic to the Olympic Peninsula, Washington, United States
Marmota vancouverensis - Vancouver Island marmot, endemic to Vancouver Island, British Columbia, Canada

Additionally, four extinct species of marmots are recognized from the fossil record:

†Marmota arizonae, Arizona, U.S.
†Marmota minor, Nevada, U.S.
Marmota robusta, China = M. himalayana
†Marmota vetus, Nebraska, U.S.

History and etymology

Marmots have been known since antiquity. Research by the French ethnologist Michel Peissel claimed the story of the "Gold-digging ant" reported by the Ancient Greek historian Herodotus, who lived in the fifth century BCE, was founded on the golden Himalayan marmot of the Deosai Plateau and the habit of local tribes such as the Brokpa to collect the gold dust excavated from their burrows.
Some historians believe that Strabo's λέων μύρμηξ and Agatharchides's μυρμηκολέων, most probably are the marmot.

An anatomically accurate image of a marmot was printed and distributed as early as 1605 by Jacopo Ligozzi, who was noted for his images of flora and fauna.

The etymology of the term "marmot" is uncertain. It may have arisen from the Gallo-Romance prefix marm-, meaning to mumble or murmur (an example of onomatopoeia). Another possible origin is postclassical Latin, mus montanus, meaning "mountain mouse".

Beginning in 2010, Alaska celebrates February 2 as "Marmot Day", a holiday intended to observe the prevalence of marmots in that state and take the place of Groundhog Day.

Relationship to the Black Death
A number of historians and paleogeneticists have postulated that the Yersinia pestis variant that caused the pandemic that struck Eurasia in the 14th century originated from a variant for which marmots in China were the natural reservoir species.

Examples of species

References

External links

 The Marmot Burrow
 International Marmot Network

Rodents of Asia
Rodents of Europe
Rodents of North America
Extant Miocene first appearances
Taxa named by Johann Friedrich Blumenbach